Karl Milford (born 1950) is an Austrian economist, emeritus professor of economics, and an associated member of the Institute Vienna Circle and the Department of Social and Economic History at the University of Vienna.

He is the son of Peter Milford-Hilferding and grandson of Rudolf Hilferding.

He has written extensively on the works Karl Popper and on epistemological views of Carl Menger and other representatives of the Austrian School of economics. He teaches history of economics, philosophy of science and philosophy of social science at the University of Vienna.

Selected works 
 1981: Normalsatzpositionen als Begründungsversuche der theoretischen Ökonomie
 1986: Zu den Lösungsversuchen des Induktionsproblems und des Abgrenzungsproblems bei Carl Menger
 2006: Karl Popper: A Centenary Assessment; co-editor with Ian Jarvie and David W. Miller, Ashgate
Volume I: Life and Times, and Values in a World of Facts. Description & Contents.
Volume II: Metaphysics and Epistemology  Description & Contents.
Volume III: Science. Description & Contents.

References 

Living people
1950 births
Academic staff of the University of Vienna
Austrian economists